Annada Shankar Ray (15 March 1904 – 28 October 2002) was an Indian poet and essayist in Bengali. He also wrote some Odia poetry.

He wrote several Bengali poems criticising the Partition of India. Most notable is "Teler shishi bhaanglo bole khukur pare raag karo. Among his many essays, the book Banglar Reneissance has an analytical history of the cultural and social revolution in Bengal. Ray's best known work is Pathe Prabaase, a diary of his trip in Europe in 1931. He died in Kolkata on 28 October 2002.

Family history 
This Bengali icon's ancestral place is Kotrung (present-day Uttarpara Kotrung) in the Hooghly district of West Bengal. His ancestors migrated from Kotrung to Balasore district of Odisha. His grandmother , Durgamoni , was the daughter of an aristocrat Bengali Sen family of Jajpur . Annada Shankar Ray's  father was Nimaicharan Ray  and his mother was the daughter of an aristocrat Bengali Palit family of Cuttack. Nimaicharan Ray shifted his base to Dhenkanal following a family feud.

Educational life
Ray graduated in English from Ravenshaw College in Cuttack. He topped the list of Indian Civil Service examinees in 1927. He had failed to make the mark in the previous year, being cut off by one rank. He was the first ICS officer from the territory later forming the state of Orissa.

Literary career
After serving in various administrative posts, he sought voluntary retirement in 1951 to devote himself to literary pursuits. Ray was a Gandhian in politics and Rabindranath Tagore inspired his literature. His first published book was Tarunya (1928), which gave him a footing as an essayist. In 1928, his first collection of poetry named Rakhi also got published. It includes poems he composed when was in England and they are creations based on Romantic imaginations thus involving the innate bond of nature and human emotions.  His first two novels were Asamapika and Agun Niye Khela. As an essayist, he was urbane and sophisticated and combined in his craft two different styles of prose, represented by Tagore and Pramatha Choudhury. A significant breakthrough in his literary career came with the publication of Pathe Prabase, a diary of his Europe trip, in 1931. Ray also established himself as a short-story writer. His collections include Prakritir Parihas (1934), Man Pavan (1946), Kamini Kanchan (1954) and Katha.

A Bengali rendering of a short story by Tolstoy and an appraisal of Sarat Chandra Chattopadhyay’s essay Narir Mulya marked his debut on the literary scene at the age of 16.

In Oriya, the poetry "Sabita" finds place in higher studies of the language at college level, making him one of the few poets to have the distinction of getting such acclaim from two different language speaking states of India.

Works
Annadashankar Roy was a contributor of both prose and poetry.

Novels
 Satyasatya (6 Novels)
 Jar Jetha Desh
 Oggatobash
 Kolonkoboti
 Dukkhomochon
 Morter Sorgo
 Opposaron
 Agun Niye Khela
 Osomapika
 Putul Niye Khela
 Na
 Konna

Essays
 Tarunno
 Amra
 Jibonshilpi
 Eahara
 Jiyonkathi
 Deshkalpatro
 Prottoy
 Notun Kore Bacha
 Adhunikota
 Art

Autobiography
 Binur Boi
 Potheprobashe
 Japane

Short story collections
 Prokritir Porihash
 Du Kan Kata
 Hason Sakhi
 Mon Pahon
 Jouban Jala
 Kamini Kanchon
 Ruper Day
 Golpo

Award
He received the Vidyasagar Smriti Award from the state government and the Padma Bhushan. He was made a fellow of the Sahitya Akademi in 1989. The Visva Bharati conferred on him the Desikottama and an honorary D.Litt. He also received the Rabindra Puraskar, the Ananda Puraskar twice and the Zaibunnisa Award of Bangladesh.

References

 Writers from Kolkata

External links
 
 
 Annada Shankar Ray at the West Bengal Public Library Network
 "Teler sisi" poem at calcuttaweb.com 
 Master of the rhyme is dead, The Telegraph
 Partition Voices Annada Sankar Ray, Andrew Whitehead

1904 births
2002 deaths
Indian Civil Service (British India) officers
Recipients of the Padma Bhushan in literature & education
Recipients of the Ananda Purashkar
Recipients of the Sahitya Akademi Fellowship
Bengali-language writers
Bengali-language poets
Odia-language writers
Recipients of the Sahitya Akademi Award in Bengali
Recipients of the Rabindra Puraskar
People from Dhenkanal
Ravenshaw University alumni
20th-century Indian poets
Indian male poets
Poets from Odisha
20th-century Indian male writers
Poets from West Bengal